Dikwididi is a village in Kgatleng District of Botswana. It is located around 40 km east of Gaborone. The village has a primary school and the population was 225 in 2011 census.

References

Kgatleng District
Villages in Botswana